The following is a list of all stops of the Tramways in Île-de-France, sorted by lines.

Stations

See also 
 Tramways in Île-de-France
 List of Paris Métro stations
 List of RER stations
 List of Transilien stations

External links 

 Open Data Île-de-France Mobilités

 
Tram